The Liga Meo Açores is a Portuguese non-professional league for association football clubs from Azores.
It belongs to the 5th tier of the Portuguese football league system with the Liga 3 creation,with promotion to the 4th Tier (Campeonato de Portugal) and relegation to the 6th Tier (Regional championships from Ponta Delgada FA, Angra do Heroísmo FA and Horta FA).

Current format
The league consists in ten teams playing a round robin as a regular season. After that teams 1 to 5 play a championship group, teams 6 to 10 play a relegation group.
The points obtained in the regular season are added to those in the playoffs. The winner of the championship group is crowned the champion and qualifies for Campeonato de Portugal.
The teams in the last three places of the relegation group get relegated to the Ponta Delgada FA, Angra do Heroísmo FA and Horta FA championships.

Teams 

For the 2016-2017 season:

List of champions 
The following teams won the league:

2013–14 Angrense
2014–15 Sporting Ideal
2015–16 Rabo Peixe
2016–17 Sp. Guadalupe
2017–18 Angrense

References

Football leagues in Portugal
Football in the Azores